This is a list of destinations that Jetstar Japan has operated to .

Destinations

References 

Jetstar Japan